1920 in radio details the internationally significant events in radio broadcasting for the year 1920.


Events 
 January
 The first informal and spasmodic broadcasts in the United Kingdom are made by the Marconi Company from Chelmsford in England. These broadcasts include both speech and music.
 Radio 2XG, which opened the previous year, is forced to close down after Lee De Forest moves the station from the Bronx (where it is licensed) to Manhattan (where it is not).
 23 February–6 March – The Marconi Company broadcasts from Chelmsford a series of 30-minute shows repeated twice daily. These include live music performances.
 15 June – Australian soprano Dame Nellie Melba becomes history's first well-known professional performer to make a radio broadcast when she sings two arias as part of the series of Marconi broadcasts from Chelmsford in Britain.
 20 August – Station 8MK in Detroit (modern-day WWJ) is the first in the world to broadcast regularly scheduled news bulletins and religious shows. The news in compiled from reports supplied by the Detroit News.
 27 August – Sociedad Radio Argentina airs a live performance of Richard Wagner's opera Parsifal from the Teatro Coliseo in Buenos Aires. Only about twenty homes in the city have a receiver with which to tune into the broadcast.
 November – The Marconi broadcasts from Chelmsford cease after it is claimed they interfere with aircraft and ship communications. They resume in 1922 regularly as 2MT.

Debuts 
20 August - WWJ in Detroit begins regular broadcasting as amateur radio station 8MK.
 2 November –  KDKA in Pittsburgh begins broadcasting as Special Amateur station 8ZZ in East Pittsburgh, Pennsylvania.
 19 December – WBT in Charlotte begins broadcasting as experimental station 4XD.

Births 
14 January – George Herman, American journalist (d. 2005)
21 January – Peggy Lee, American singer, songwriter, composer and actress (d. 2002)
2 April – Ian Messiter, British panel game creator (d. 1999)
12 June – Peter Jones, British comic actor (d. 2000)
18 June – Ian Carmichael, British actor (d. 2010)
28 June – Irene Thomas, British radio quiz show player (d. 2001)
15 October – Robert Rockwell, American actor (d. 2003)
24 October – Steve Conway, British singer (d. 1952)

References

See also 
 List of oldest radio stations

 
Radio by year